Toine Heijmans is a Dutch writer and journalist. He was born in 1969. He made his literary debut with the non-fiction book La Vie Vinex (2007), followed by his first novel Op Zee (At Sea, 2011). This book has been translated into several European languages and won the Prix Médicis étranger in 2013.

Heijmans works for de Volkskrant.

References

Dutch writers
Dutch journalists
Prix Médicis étranger winners
1969 births
Living people
Date of birth missing (living people)